Sondern is a small village approximately  the north of Radevormwald, in Oberbergischer Kreis district, North Rhine-Westphalia, Germany. It lies to the south of Remlingrade, and in close proximity to Birken, Im Kamp, and Herkingrade. Politically the village is represented by candidates of the electoral district 170 of the  Radevormwald city Council. Around the year 1400 the village was mentioned as "Sunderen" in documents of the archives of the Reformed church in Radevormwald in connection with the description of the boundaries of the Free Court of Radevormwald at the time.

References

Villages in North Rhine-Westphalia
Oberbergischer Kreis